The Salerno - Costa d'Amalfi Airport , located in the municipality of Pontecagnano Faiano and close to Bellizzi, is an airport in southern Italy, in Salerno city and the west coastal areas of Amalfi to the north and Cilento to the south. It is also commonly known as Salerno-Pontecagnano Airport.

History
The airport was founded in 1926 by Aeronautica Militare, Italy's military air force. A flight training facility was established between 1933 and 1943. The first hangar was designed by the famous architect Pier Luigi Nervi. In 1946, a meteorological service was established, and in 1952, the Salerno Air Club was founded. The airport has hosted the Carabinieri helipad since 1975, and the Firefighter helipad and a parachuting school since 1984. A new control tower was built in 1987. The airport was exclusively used by the Carabinieri, Firefighters, flight and parachuting school and small private jets until 2007.The airport was then developed to accommodate civil traffic on a large scale, with four check-in desks, two boarding areas, luggage belts and waiting rooms. The runway has a VOR system, a radio direction finder VDF and a lighting system. The runway's length was extended to 1,654 m, with a further extension to 2,020 m planned. In 2011 a project was presented for the extension of the runway up to 2,020 m (more than 60 m of anti blast) and for the creation of new buildings and other technical adjustments.

Airlines and destinations

Scheduled flights started in 2008 with the company VolaSalerno, which worked from August 2, 2008 to December 18, 2008, followed by Air Dolomiti from July 27, 2009 to May 7, 2010, Alitalia from December 1, 2010 to March 23, 2012, Skybridge AirOps, Air Dolomiti and Danube Wings from June, 2012 to October, 2012.

, the charter airline, Air Vallée, was running charter flights between Salerno and Corfu.

During Summer 2016, Denim Air operated charter flights to Corfu, Ibiza, Tabres/Lourdes, Malta, Milan-Malpensa, Mostar, Olbia, Verona. Flights were operated with a Fokker 100 with 100 seats.

Statistics

Transport
 Car:
Motorway A2 SA-RC, Montecorvino Pugliano - Pontecagnano Sud - Airport exit;
Salerno Bypass, SP 417 "Aversana"- Airport exit;
Strada statale 18 Tirrena Inferiore.
 Parking: 150 free parking spaces in front of the terminal.
 Taxi: fixed fee from/to Salerno 30 Euro, from/to Battipaglia 15 Euro.
 Bus: CSTP 8 line.
 Train: Salerno and Pontecagnano Faiano stations.
 Subway: an extension of Metropolitana di Salerno to the airport is planned.

Distances
Bellizzi: 
Pontecagnano, Battipaglia: 
Faiano: 
Salerno: 
University of Salerno: 
Paestum: 
Palinuro: 
Amalfi: 
Avellino, Pompei: 
Ercolano, Positano: 
Naples: 
Sorrento: 
Benevento, Potenza: 
Caserta:

See also 

 List of airports in Italy

References

External links

 
 First flight Salerno-Milan Malpensa video

Airfields of the United States Army Air Forces in Italy
Airports established in 1926
Airports in Italy
Airport
Province of Salerno
Transport in Campania